Roy Ralph (22 May 1920 – 31 March 2015) was an English cricketer. He played for Essex between 1953 and 1961. Ralph died on 31 March 2015.

References

External links

1920 births
2015 deaths
English cricketers
Essex cricketers
People from East Ham